Glandirana minima (known as Fujian frog or little gland frog) is a species of frog in the family Ranidae. It is endemic to the eastern parts of the Fujian province, China, (in Fuzhou, Fuqing, Yongtai and Changle, Xianyou). Its natural habitats are rivers, swamps, freshwater marshes, intermittent freshwater marshes, ponds, and irrigated land. It is threatened by habitat loss.

References

minima
Amphibians of China
Endemic fauna of China
Taxonomy articles created by Polbot
Amphibians described in 1979
Endangered Fauna of China